The Low Road is a 2007 Ned Kelly Award-winning novel by the Australian author Chris Womersley.

Awards

Victorian Premier's Literary Award, Prize for an Unpublished Manuscript by an Emerging Victorian Writer, 2006: shortlisted 
Ned Kelly Awards for Crime Writing, Best First Novel, 2008: winner

Notes

Dedication: "For my mother, my brother and my sister, who know something of the roads I have travelled."
Epigraph: "A man's character is his fate." - Heraclitus, On the Universe. 
Epigraph: 
"And what the dead had no speech for, when living 
They can tell you, being dead: the communication 
Of the dead is tongued with fire beyond the language of the living." - T.S.Eliot, Little Gidding.

Reviews

"The Age" 
"The Australian" 
"Australian Crime Fiction Database" 
"First Tuesday Book Club" 
"Readings" 

Australian crime novels
2007 Australian novels
Ned Kelly Award-winning works
Scribe (publisher) books